Abablemma bilineata is a moth species in the family Erebidae. It was first described by William Barnes and James Halliday McDunnough in 1916 and it is found in North America.

The MONA or Hodges number for Abablemma bilineata is 8438.

References

Further reading

 
 
 

Scolecocampinae
Articles created by Qbugbot
Moths described in 1916